José María García de Toledo y de Madariaga (11 February 1769 — 24 February 1816) was a Neogranadine lawyer and politician, who fought against the Royalist forces during the Patria Boba period that preceded the Colombian War of Independence.

Soon after the banishment of the Spanish governor on 14 June 1810 a Supreme Junta was established in Cartagena de Indias as a direct response to Napoleon's invasion of Spain. García was named as its president, and on 11 November 1811, the Junta declared the independence of Cartagena from Spain.  He was later shot by Pablo Morillo on 24 Feb. 1816, after the city was "pacified".

References

1769 births
1816 deaths
People from Cartagena, Colombia
Del Rosario University alumni
18th-century Colombian lawyers
People of the Colombian War of Independence